Marilyn Lawrence (née Pryde; born 15 May 1952) is a former New Zealand professional tennis player.

Tennis career
Pryde won her first national championship in 1968 as a 15-year old and made her debut for the New Zealand Federation Cup team in 1970, going on to feature in eight ties. She was runner-up to Evonne Goolagong at the 1973 New Zealand Open and also came up against Goolagong in one of her appearances at Wimbledon.

Personal life
Pryde's daughter, jewellery and handbag designer Kelly Lawrence, is married to New Zealand triathlete Terenzo Bozzone.

References

External links
 
 

1952 births
Living people
New Zealand female tennis players